Seven Hills, an electoral district of the Legislative Assembly in the Australian state of New South Wales, was created in 1981, abolished in 1991 and recreated in 2015.


Members for Seven Hills

Election results

Elections in the 2010s

2019

2015

1991 - 2015

Elections in the 1980s

1988

1984

1981

References

New South Wales state electoral results by district